Hyalobagrus flavus is a species of bagrid catfish endemic to Indonesia where it is known only from the Batang Hari drainage in Sumatra and the Mentaya River basin in southern Borneo where it inhabits brown water habitats that are closely associated with blackwater peat swamps.  They occur in large shoals, sometimes mixed with other species of shoaling catfish such as Pseudeutropius brachypopterus and P. moolengurghae.

References 
 

Bagridae
Fish of Asia
Freshwater fish of Indonesia
Taxa named by Heok Hee Ng
Taxa named by Maurice Kottelat
Fish described in 1998